Cerveza Pacífico Clara, better known as Pacífico, is a Mexican pilsner-style beer. Cerveza Pacífico is named so because the Pacífico brewery is located in the Pacific Ocean port city of Mazatlán, in the state of Sinaloa, México.

History

It was first brewed in 1900 when three Germans, Jorge Claussen, Germán Evers and Emilio Radostits opened a brewery, the Cerveceria del Pacífico, in Mazatlán. Its label includes a picture depicting a lifesaver encircling a ship's anchor superimposed over the port's lighthouse hill, known locally as "Cerro del Crestón." In Mazatlán, the beer is available in four different size bottles: "cuartitos" (6 fl. oz),  "medias" (12 fl. oz.), "ballenas" (32 fl. oz.) and "Ballenón" (1.2 L).

Alcohol content: 4.5 percent. "Clara" means clear, blonde, as opposed to "oscura" (dark).

The Pacífico brewery was bought by Mexican brewing giant Grupo Modelo in 1954, which was later acquired by the Belgian-Brazilian Anheuser-Busch InBev company.

 the brand is owned and marketed in Australia by Lion.

See also
Mexican beer

References

Beer in Mexico
Mexican brands